William Abner Stanfill (January 16, 1892June 12, 1971) was briefly a member of the United States Senate from Kentucky.

Stanfill attended Union College and received a law degree from the University of Kentucky in 1912.  He practiced law in Barbourville, Kentucky and Hazard, Kentucky.  He served on the board of regents of Morehead State Teachers College (now Morehead State University) 1927 – 1931.

United States Senator Happy Chandler, a Democrat, resigned his Senate seat to become Commissioner of Baseball on November 1, 1945.  Republican Governor of Kentucky Simeon S. Willis appointed Stanfill, a Republican, to the vacant Senate seat on November 19, 1945.  Stanfill did not run for election to the seat.  He served from November 19, 1945, to November 5, 1946 when his successor, John Sherman Cooper who had won the seat by election, assumed the Senate seat.  Stanfill then resumed the practice of law and later retired to Lexington, Kentucky.

External links 
 
 

1892 births
1971 deaths
People from Barbourville, Kentucky
Politicians from Lexington, Kentucky
People from Hazard, Kentucky
Republican Party United States senators from Kentucky
Kentucky Republicans
Union College (Kentucky) alumni
20th-century American politicians